Yoelqui Céspedes Maceo (born September 24, 1997), also known as Yoelkis Céspedes, is a Cuban professional baseball outfielder for the Chicago White Sox organization. He played for Alazanes de Granma of the Cuban National Series before he defected from Cuba.

Career
Céspedes played for the Alazanes de Granma of the Cuban National Series. He batted .287/.351/.415 in Cuba. He also played for the Cuba national baseball team in the 2017 World Baseball Classic.

On June 25, 2019, Céspedes defected from Cuba while in Dayton, Ohio. At the time, he was playing for the Cuba national baseball team, which was participating in a CanAm League showcase event. He worked out in the Bahamas, preparing for Major League Baseball to declare him a free agent.

On December 22, 2020, Céspedes agreed to a $2 million contract with the Chicago White Sox. The White Sox announced the signing on January 15, 2021. On June 19, he was assigned to the high-A Winston-Salem Dash of High-A East. In June 2021, Cespedes was selected to play in the All-Star Futures Game. The White Sox promoted Céspedes to the Birmingham Barons of Double-A South and assigned him to the Glendale Desert Dogs of the Arizona Fall League after the regular season. He played for Birmingham for the 2022 season and batted .258 with 17 home runs and 59 RBIs in 119 games played; he also had 154 strikeouts and only 29 walks.

Personal life
His half-brother is Yoenis Céspedes.

See also
List of baseball players who defected from Cuba

References
C

External links

1997 births
Living people
Alazanes de Granma players
Baseball outfielders
Cuban expatriate baseball players in the United States
People from Yara, Cuba
2017 World Baseball Classic players
Winston-Salem Dash players
Birmingham Barons players
Defecting Cuban baseball players